Keshav Srushti is a nature retreat of about , located at Uttan village, in the northern Mumbai suburb of Bhayander, India. It is a unified campus of several organisations, run by the Rashtriya Swayamsevak Sangh, in the memory of its founder Dr. Keshav Baliram Hegdewar.

Several environmental orientation activities are conducted in the Keshav Srushti campus. The nature trail in the campus has over  species of trees ranging from Teak, Palm, Ain, Kinjal, Arjun, Casurina, Jamun, Palas, Bamboo, Wad, Ashoka, Silver Oak, Babhul, Acassia, Kadamb, Shankasur, Umbar etc. The campus also has over 500 species of medicinal plants planted over a 22 acre area which are used in the development ayurvedic formulations. The Keshav Srushti talav has been listed as a heritage site by the Mumbai Metropolitan Region Heritage Conservation Society.

Initiatives

Social initiatives 
Keshav Srushti has adopted 75 villages in the region, taking care of various initiatives like education, water conservation and skill development through its volunteers and donors, for the people in the region.

In March 2019, Keshav Srushti collaborated with the MBMC for a waste management exercise to turn organic waste into farm compost. In January 2015, the Suryakumbh, an event on social justice and environmental project, was organized at Keshav Srushti. The Suryakumbh event saw over 3639 students, from over 62 schools in Mumbai, participate to set the record for the largest solar cooking class. The waste management initiative has seen participation from thousands of people, and several people have requested the extension of the initiative for their respective housing societies.

The Gau Seva Parishad, at Keshav Srushti, is home to 220 cows, bulls, oxen and calves that are a part of the 4 acre gaushala.

In August 2017, the Indian Institute of Democratic leadership was set up at the Keshav Srushti Campus. It offers a 9 month program for people aspiring to join politics.

Keeping in mind the need to conserve and expand our green cover, Keshav Srushti works with several corporations, like PWC and others, through its seedball initiative.

Rural development initiatives 
The rural development initiative of Keshav Srushti also known as the gram vikas yojna involves several initiatives. One of them is engaging rural children, who don't have access to the internet, with educational books. For this, a mobile library collection, of over 1100 books, called Knowledge on Wheels, has been set up. They also have a trained teacher on board who works with the rural children on their learning needs. Another initiative called Urban Rural Connect involves training rural households especially womenfolk from tribal communities in the skill of crafting bamboo products. Starting with small beginnings the initiative now has around 90 products being manufactured at the Tetwali village of Vikramgad taluka in Palghar district, Maharashtra.

Motivational initiatives 
Awards are given by Keshav Srushti to deserving social workers, to appreciate and promote their efforts. In 2019, this award was given to Sagar Reddy of Ekta Niradhar Sangh for his outstanding contribution to the cause of orphaned children.

Environmental initiatives 
In 2017, Keshav Srushti organised the waste management exhibition, which was attended by over 5,000 people, and around 50 expressed their interest in making their society waste-free. In June 2018 the organization led by Ms Savitha Rao planted the first mini forest in Mumbai at Goregaon. In March 2022, Keshav Srushti in collaboration with BrihanMumbai Municipal Corporation planted 7000 saplings in the suburb of Versova that included native saplings, medicinal herbs and butterfuly shrubs. The plantation was done over an area of 1800 square metres at the Bala Guste garden Versova using the Akira Miyawaki technique of planting dense forests. In June 2022, the environmental initiative of Keshav Srushti called City forests started the work of planting urban forest in the garbage dumpyard area of the Dhaavgi village in Uttan.

Entrepreneurship development initiatives 
The Keshav Srushti campus also hosts Atal Incubation Centre for start ups and entrepreneurship education and development.

COVID-19 relief initiatives 
During the COVID pandemic, in 2020, Keshav Srushti My Green Society along with Jankalyan Samiti undertook the 'Annapurna Scheme' to serve meals to 1.2 lakh needy people, in 24 wards of Mumbai city, through 17 community kitchens. The food packets were distributed through the BMC, the RSS network of  NGOs and other volunteer organizations. Later in August 2021, Keshav Srushti collaborated with an Young Volunteers Organization to channelize their funds and relief efforts towards COVID-19 relief for 70 families and orphan children who lost their family members in the COVID pandemic.

Events 
In the year 2000 the Vishwa Adhyayan Kendra hosted 568 delegates from 38 countries at the Keshav Srushti campus for the Vishwa Sangh Shivir. Keshav Srushti hosted the President of India, Ramnath Kovind, at the Economic Democracy Conclave organised by the Rambhau Mhalgi Prabodhini, in April 2020. Keshav Srushti has also instituted the Keshav Srushti awards, that are conferred upon prominent people, for their efforts in the field of social work. In January 2021, the 11th edition of the Keshav Srushti awards were presented to 13 corona warriors, who were felicitated by the Governor of Maharashtra, Bhagat Singh Koshiyari, at this residence at Raj Bhavan.

References

External links
 

Non-profit organisations based in India
Mira-Bhayandar
Organisations based in Maharashtra
Tourist attractions in Thane district
Year of establishment missing
Rashtriya Swayamsevak Sangh